Vaughn Stocksdale (October 27, 1939 – March 29, 2016) was a Democratic member of the Ohio House of Representatives, representing the 3rd District from 1965 to 1968.

Stocksdale was a Democratic representative from conservative Darke County, serving as one of the only Democratic representatives from rural western Ohio. He did not seek re-election in 1968.  He died in 2016.

External links

1939 births
Living people
Democratic Party members of the Ohio House of Representatives